The Emoinu Fish Fest, also known as the Imoinu Fish Festival(), is an upcoming grand fair, to be organised by the Department of Fisheries, Government of Manipur, on the 12th day of the Meitei lunar month of "Wakching", which is traditionally, the day of Emoinu Eratpa (Imoinu Iratpa), the sacred festival dedicated to Emoinu (Imoinu), the ancient Meitei goddess of wealth and prosperity. 
The first edition of the event will be organised on 3rd January, 2023.
The event will be organised in the Hapta Kangjeibung in Imphal East district, Manipur.

The fish festival will commence from the morning of the very day, due to the fact that there will be ritual ceremony during the nighttime.
During this festival, "Sareng" will be made available abundantly, besides other fish species.

Objectives and services 
The festival aims to provide fishes for religious offerings, with which the fishery sectors would be promoted for sustainable growth and development. It will also act as a "One Stop Solution" to the people for Emoinu Eratpa festival. In this event, fresh vegetables, fruits, fishes, etc. will be available with the participation of Department of Agriculture and various other departments of the Manipur Government as well as other privately owned commercials.

Governmental terms and conditions 
The Manipur Government mandates that the farmers should sell their fish at the price rate fixed by the department concerned. The transportation charges for the participating fish farmers will be beared by the governmental department. The department will provide the stalls at free of cost. The timing at which farmer should bring their fish products to the venue is between 9 AM to 11 AM.

According to an instruction by the Government, the fish sellers should bring their own weighing machines and should separately keep their fishes, species-wise, so that the governmental assessment officials could check them properly.

See also 
 Festival of Moirang Shai
 Ngaleima
 Ningol Chakkouba
 Sangai festival

Notes

References

External links 
 Emoinu Fish Fest at 

Festivals established in the 2020s
Meitei festivals